Dr Leslie Mitchell MA, DPhil, FRHistS is an academic historian specialising in British history.

Mitchell is currently an Emeritus Fellow of University College and a member of the History Faculty at the University of Oxford, England. He has been Dean of the college, appeared in the Univ Revue, recruited students for work in the intelligence services and was editor of the University College Record, an annual publication for former members of the college. Mitchell is counted among a talented generation of post-war historians, including Maurice Keen, Alexander Murray and Henry Mayr-Harting.

Books
 
 
 
 
 

Reception to Bulwer Lytton: The Rise and Fall of a Victorian Man of Letters

Reception to The Whig World

References

Year of birth missing (living people)
Living people
Alumni of the University of Oxford
20th-century English historians
21st-century English historians
20th-century biographers
21st-century biographers
Historians of the United Kingdom
Fellows of University College, Oxford
Fellows of the Royal Historical Society